Russkiy Reyd, also in English territories as Russian Raid is a 2020 Russian action film directed by Denis Kryuchkov. It was theatrically released in Russia on October 1, 2020.

Plot 
The film tells about the raiders who have prepared a seemingly flawless plan to seize one plant, which leads the raiders into a trap prepared by their leader, for whom the main thing is not money, but justice.

Cast

References

External links 
 

2020 films
2020s Russian-language films
2020 action films
Russian action films